Morris Dam (officially the Samuel B. Morris Dam) is a concrete gravity dam across the San Gabriel River in the U.S. state of California. It impounds Morris Reservoir, directly downstream of San Gabriel Dam.

The dam was built in the 1930s as a water supply facility for the city of Pasadena, but is now mostly utilized for flood control and flow regulation for groundwater recharge. Situated in northern Los Angeles County, the dam impounds the  Morris Reservoir in the Angeles National Forest, a few miles northeast of Azusa. From the 1940s to the 1990s, the reservoir was also used for underwater missile testing by the United States military.

Design and location

Its spillway, located slightly north of the main structure, is a concrete-lined chute controlled by three steel drum gates. The reservoir created by the dam, when first put into use, was capable of storing . Due to sedimentation though since that time, its capacity has been reduced by about 29%.

History
Morris Dam was originally slated to be called Pine Canyon Dam, but was renamed for the chief engineer of construction, Samuel Brooks Morris of the Pasadena Water Department. With the dam envisioned as a private structure for Pasadena, groundbreaking was in April 1932 and construction was completed in May 1934, four months behind schedule. Upon completion the dam was dedicated by former United States President Herbert Hoover. In 1935, contrary to its original purpose, Morris Dam was sold to the Metropolitan Water District of Southern California (MWD), which owned it through most of the 20th century.

The dam was completed prior to the catastrophic Los Angeles Flood of 1938, the most severe flood recorded in Southern California since the Great Flood of 1862. Along with San Gabriel Dam, which at the time was under construction, the Cogswell Dam upstream and the Morris Dam greatly reduced the flood peak on the San Gabriel River, saving downstream cities millions of dollars' worth of damages.

Morris Reservoir Naval Weapons Test Site
Beginning in World War II, Morris Reservoir was used for the Morris Reservoir Naval Weapons Test Site for the U.S. Navy in conjunction with the California Institute of Technology. A wide variety of weapons, including torpedoes and ballistic missiles, had their trial runs here. Testing continued until the 1990s, when most of the structures at the associated military compound were demolished. However, the concrete foundations remain and are easily seen from State Route 39, which runs past the dam and reservoir. In 1995, MWD sold the dam to the Los Angeles County Department of Public Works, which continues to operate it and the reservoir today.

See also
Los Angeles County Department of Public Works dams
List of reservoirs and dams in California

References

Notes

External links

Schematic of major reservoirs in the Los Angeles and San Gabriel River watersheds
Historic American Engineering Record (HAER) documentation of test site, filed under CA State Highway 39 at Morris Reservoir, Azusa, Los Angeles County, CA:

Los Angeles County Department of Public Works dams
Gravity dams
San Gabriel River (California)
San Gabriel Mountains
Angeles National Forest
Azusa, California
Dams completed in 1934
1934 establishments in California
Historic American Engineering Record in California